Grace Rock is a rock in Bransfield Strait, Antarctica lying  off the southeast coast of Nelson Island in the South Shetland Islands. It was named by the UK Antarctic Place-Names Committee in 1961 after the British sealing vessel Grace (Captain H. Rowe) from Plymouth, which visited the South Shetland Islands in 1821–22.

Map
 South Shetland Islands. Scale 1:200000 topographic map No. 3373. DOS 610 - W 62 58. Tolworth, UK, 1968.

References

 SCAR Composite Antarctic Gazetteer.

Islands of the South Shetland Islands